Rothenberg is a community in the Odenwaldkreis district in Hesse, Germany.

Rothenberg may also refer to:
 20512 Rothenberg, an asteroid
 Rothenberg Fortress, a fortress in the Nürnberger Land district in Bavaria, Germany
 Rothenberg propriety, a concept in music theory
 Rothenberg Ventures, a Venture Capital firm

People with the surname 
 Adam Rothenberg (born 1975), American actor
 Alan Rothenberg (born 1939), American soccer owner and official
 Albert Rothenberg (born 1930), American psychiatrist
 Betty Rothenberg, American television and theater director
 Ellen Rothenberg (born 1949), American visual artist and writer
 Gunther E. Rothenberg (1923–2004), military historian
 Hans Rothenberg (born 1961), Swedish politician
 James Rothenberg (born 1946), American businessman
 Jerome Rothenberg (born 1931), American poet
 Karly Rothenberg (born 1962), American film and television actor
 Laura Rothenberg (1981–2003), American author
 Michael Rothenberg, American poet, songwriter, editor, and environmentalist
 Ned Rothenberg (born 1956), American multi-instrumentalist and composer
 Stanley Rothenberg (1930–2006), American lawyer specializing in international copyright
 Stuart Rothenberg (born 1948), American political pollster 
 Susan Rothenberg (1945–2020), American contemporary painter

See also 
 Rosenberg (surname)
 Rotenberg (disambiguation) 
 Rotenburg (disambiguation)
 Rothenburg (disambiguation) 
 Rottenburg (disambiguation)

German-language surnames
Jewish surnames
Yiddish-language surnames
he:רוטנברג